Carl Craig (born 1969) is an American electronic music producer and DJ.

Carl Craig may also refer to:
Carl Craig (football manager), English football manager
Carl Craig (politician), American politician